The iodite ion, or iodine dioxide anion, is the halite with the chemical formula . Within the ion the Iodine exists in the oxidation state of +3.

Iodite anion
Iodites (including iodous acid) are highly unstable and have been observed but never isolated. They will rapidly disproportionate to molecular Iodine and Iodates. However, they have been detected as intermediates in the conversion between iodide and iodate.

Iodous acid

Iodous acid is acid form of the iodite ion, with the formula HIO2.

Other oxyanions
Iodine can assume oxidation states of −1, +1, +3, +5, or +7. A number of neutral iodine oxides are also known.

References

Iodine oxyanions
Oxygen compounds
Halites